Colossal may refer to:

 Colossal (film), a 2016 science fiction film starring Anne Hathaway
 (Colossal) Pictures, entertainment company which closed in 2000
 Colossal (band), American punk band formed in 2001
 "Colossal", a song by Scale the Summit from the album The Collective
 "Colossal", a song by Wolfmother from their debut album Wolfmother
 Colossal (blog), art and visual culture blog
 Colossal (chestnut), American chestnut cultivar
 Colossal Biosciences, a biotechnology company

See also
 
 
 Colossal Connection, former professional wrestling tag team
 Colossal Kongs, former professional wrestling tag team
 Colossus (disambiguation)